Rita Rosina Verreos (born July 19, 1968) is a TV host, news anchor, actress, beauty pageant coach, model, Miss 
Venezuela contestant, and reality television contestant-CBS Survivor.

Personal life

A native of Venezuela, Verreos moved to San Francisco with her family when she was 8 years old. She attended UC Berkeley before graduating cum laude from the University of California at Los Angeles with a bachelor's degree in Italian and French Literature. She is a member of the Golden Key National Honor Society. After graduating from UCLA, she got married and moved to  Mexico City to live with her husband and children for 11 years before moving to San Antonio in 2003. She and her husband divorced in 2004.

She currently lives in Miami, Florida.

Rita married actor and producer Carl Mergenthaler on June 8, 2014.

Pageants

Verreos was a contestant in the Miss Venezuela 1988 pageant while representing Municipio Vargas, and competed in the 1988 "Reinado Mundial de Banano" pageant in Machala, Ecuador, placing second to Ximena Correa of Ecuador. Verreos has also judged many pageants, including Miss Oklahoma USA, Miss Kansas USA, Miss Hawaiian Tropic San Antonio, Miss, Teen & Mrs. International.  She's currently one of the Top Beauty Pageant Coaches in the U.S., coaching young women for many pageants including Miss Texas, Miss California and Miss USA pageants.

Television appearances

Verreos competed in San Antonio magazine Conexión's 2005 "Hottest Latina" contest, placing as second runner-up, and in the CMT reality television program The Ultimate Coyote Ugly Search.

Rita was recruited by Survivor casting director Lynne Spillman at a beauty pageant, and became a contestant on Survivor: Fiji, the 14th season of the series.  Her strategy was to draw on her sex appeal to win the show's million dollar prize. She lost 15 pounds during filming, and suffered broken cartilage in her nose. Verreos was the sixth castaway to leave the island.

Verreos was a contestant on the May 29th, 2009, episode of The Price is Right. At the wheel, Verreos came 35 cents shy of winning the first showcase showdown. Verreos' television debut was in 2003 as a TV spokesperson for H-E-B, a Texas-based supermarket chain  which aired on the Kens 5 (CBS) morning talk show, "Great Day SA."

Verreos has also hosted "En Nuestro Hogar" on Telemundo and Azteca America in San Antonio (June, 2007), acted as a fill-in for the Kens 5 morning news Traffic Anchor (2008), served as a guest host on HSN (2009-2010) and as a "beauty tips expert" on Fox Utilisima's "Hola Martin" (2011), and acted as a fill-in anchor for KVDA Telemundo. She appeared as the TV spokesperson in the World Car TV commercials (Univision, Telemundo, 2008–2014) and infomercials on WOAI (San Antonio). She has appeared in national television commercials for Safelink cellular phones and Bedoyecta Vitamins. She created, produced and hosted the web show Latin Connection (2008-2014), and from 2017 to 2018, she appeared in roles in the Telemundo series Sangre de mí tierra (2017), Al otro lado del muro (2018), and Mi familia perfecta (2018). In 2019 she became one of the few News Anchors presenting and producing newscasts for both Spanish language (Telemundo KXTQ and KASA) and English language (FOX34) networks. Currently she is the first and only TV Show Host on Jewelry Television presenting shows in English and Spanish.

Other

Verreos is a former professional ballerina, and has modeled in Venezuela, Mexico, and Los Angeles, for designers such as Oscar de la Renta and Victor Alfaro.  She also appeared in the 1990 film Marked for Death.
Rita was the "In Arena" Host at the AT & T Center for the Spurs Organization female basketball team the Silver Stars during the 2010 season. In 2008, she was awarded the "Outstanding Achievement in Entertainment" Award by La Prensa Newspaper. In 2010, Rita won the "Dancing with the Lonestars" Ballroom dancing competition to raise funds for a local charity in San Antonio, TX. In 2011, Rita received the President's Call to Service Award for Lifetime Achievement in Volunteerism for her decade of philanthropic work.

References

External links
Official website

Rita Verros biography for Survivor: Fiji at CBS.com

1968 births
Living people
Venezuelan beauty pageant winners
Survivor (American TV series) contestants
Venezuelan emigrants to the United States
University of California, Los Angeles alumni
People from Caracas
People from San Antonio